The 2021 Texas State Bobcats baseball team represented Texas State University during the 2021 NCAA Division I baseball season. The Bobcats played their home games at Bobcat Ballpark and were led by second-year head coach Steven Trout. They were members of the Sun Belt Conference.

Preseason

Signing Day Recruits

Sun Belt Conference Coaches Poll
The Sun Belt Conference Coaches Poll was released on February 15, 2021 and the Bobcats were picked to finish first in the West Division and second overall in the conference.

Roster

Coaching staff

Schedule and results

Schedule Source:
*Rankings are based on the team's current ranking in the D1Baseball poll.

Rankings

References

Texas State
Texas State Bobcats baseball seasons
Texas State Bobcats baseball